Brigita Bukovec (born 21 May 1970) is a retired Slovenian hurdler who won an Olympic silver medal in 1996. During the Olympics she set a personal best time with 12.59 seconds.

She retired from athletics at the end of the1999 season.

Biography
Bukovec was born in Ljubljana on 21 May 1970.

Bukovec started her career as an athlete in her home country, specializing in hurdles. She ran the 100 metre below 13 for the first time in 1993. That year, she was also chosen as Slovenian Sportswoman of the Year; an award that she was to win a total of five times (the other years being 1995, 1996, 1997, 1998).

Bukovec won the gold medal at the 1993 Mediterranean Games, and another gold medal at the 1994 Goodwill Games. She achieved fourth place in 60m hurdles at the 1994 European Athletics Indoor Championships in Paris and fourth place in 100m hurdles at the 1994 European Athletics Championships in Helsinki.

Trained by the late Jure Kastelic, she also won the bronze at the 1995 World Indoor Championships in Barcelona in the 60 m hurdles and a silver medal in 100 m at the 1998 European Championships.

At the 1996 Olympic games she went very close to winning the gold in 100 m hurdles, just a hundredth of a second away from conquering the Olympic gold. She won the silver medal in Atlanta with 12.59 seconds.

After her Olympic achievement, she continued to compete at a high level, but her career was interrupted before the next Summer Olympic Games. Bukovec won a silver medal in 100m hurdles at the 1997 Mediterranean Games, and in 1998 she won the silver at the European Athletics Championships, where she ran the 100m in 12.65, just shy of her Olympic record. She had to give up her athletic career in 1999 due to health issues.

Bukovec was named Slovenian Sportswoman of the Year for five times. At the time of her retirement she was the only Slovenian athlete to win this award for five times (she won it consecutively from 1995 to 1998). She was also named Slovenian Woman of the Year.

Personal life
After her retirement she gave birth to two children and devoted herself to her new job as a mother. Bukovec and her family later resettled in Switzerland.

Competition record

References

External links

1970 births
Living people
Yugoslav female hurdlers
Slovenian female hurdlers
Athletes (track and field) at the 1992 Summer Olympics
Athletes (track and field) at the 1996 Summer Olympics
Olympic athletes of Slovenia
Olympic silver medalists for Slovenia
Sportspeople from Ljubljana
World Athletics Championships athletes for Yugoslavia
World Athletics Championships athletes for Slovenia
European Athletics Championships medalists
Medalists at the 1996 Summer Olympics
Olympic silver medalists in athletics (track and field)
Goodwill Games medalists in athletics
Mediterranean Games gold medalists for Slovenia
Mediterranean Games silver medalists for Slovenia
Mediterranean Games medalists in athletics
Athletes (track and field) at the 1993 Mediterranean Games
Athletes (track and field) at the 1997 Mediterranean Games
Competitors at the 1994 Goodwill Games